The 1923 New Year Honours in New Zealand were appointments by King George V on the advice of the New Zealand government to various orders and honours to reward and highlight good works by New Zealanders. The awards celebrated the passing of 1922 and the beginning of 1923, and were announced on 1 January 1923.

The recipients of honours are displayed here as they were styled before their new honour.

Knight Bachelor
 Harold Beauchamp – of Wellington; lately chairman of the board of directors of the Bank of New Zealand, and a leading financial authority.
 George Elliot  – of Auckland; chairman of the board of directors of the Bank of New Zealand. Has frequently acted as arbitrator in industrial disputes.

Order of Saint Michael and Saint George

Knight Grand Cross (GCMG)
 The Honourable Sir Francis Henry Dillon Bell  – attorney-general and leader of the Legislative Council.

Companion (CMG)
 Edward Newman – of Marton; for many years member of the House of Representatives, and author of the movement resulting in the "New Zealand Sheepowners' Acknowledgment of Debt to British Seamen Fund".
 Colonel Robert Ward Tate  – lately administrator of Western Samoa.

Order of the British Empire

Commander (CBE)
Civil division
 William Barr Montgomery  – of Wellington; permanent head of the Customs Department.
 Henry Percy Pickerill  – of Dunedin. In recognition of valuable services since the war in connection with facial and jaw operations on wounded soldiers.
 Bernard Edward Howard Tripp  – of Timaru; representative of New Zealand at the Red Cross conference at Geneva, 1921.

Officer (OBE)
Civil division
 William Henry Leader Foster  – of Wellington; headmaster of the Clyde Quay Primary School.

King's Police Medal (KPM)
 Francis John O'Donoghue – of Wanganui; constable, New Zealand Police.
 Roger John Wilson – of Wanganui; constable, New Zealand Police.

References

New Year Honours
1923 awards
1923 in New Zealand
New Zealand awards